Reda is a surname. Notable people with the surname include:

Felix Reda, German politician, MEP for the Pirate Party 2014–2019
Francesco Reda, Italian cyclist
Gino Reda, sports journalist
Giovanni Reda, photographer and filmer of skateboarding
Jacques Réda, contemporary French poet
Mahmoud Reda, Egyptian choreographer and dancer
Marco Reda, Canadian association football player
Robin Reda, French politician